Silvio Anočić (born 10 September 1997 in Croatia) is a Croatian footballer, who currently plays for third tier side Belišće.

Club career
At the age of 16, Anočić signed for Italian Serie A side A.S. Roma. 

In 2017, he was supposed to be sent on loan to Genoa C.F.C. in the Italian Serie A, but did not pass the medical examination due to inflammation, which ended up keeping him out for 28 months.

In 2019, Anočić was sent on loan to Croatian second division club HNK Cibalia.

In 2020, he signed for NK Belišće in the Croatian third division from top flight team HNK Šibenik.

References

External links
 Silvio Anočić at Soccerway

1997 births
Living people
Croatian footballers
Footballers from Osijek
HNK Cibalia players
HNK Šibenik players
NK Belišće players
First Football League (Croatia) players
Second Football League (Croatia) players
Croatia youth international footballers
Association football midfielders
Association football wingers
Association football defenders